Congregation B'nai Israel (בני ישראל in Hebrew) is the oldest Jewish congregation in Sacramento, California. The congregation, which began as an Orthodox community, traces its history back to the California Gold Rush of 1849, when Jewish settlers gathered to observe the High Holy days. The congregation purchased its first building at 7th and L streets on September 2, 1852, making it the first congregationally owned synagogue west of the Mississippi River.

History

Locations

The congregation has survived the destruction caused by fires and floods throughout its history. In November 1852, fire destroyed its original location at 7th and L streets, and it met in congregants' homes until 1858. A Methodist congregation had constructed a building on their former lot during this time, and in 1858 B'nai Israel purchased this new building. Three years later, it too was destroyed by fire. In 1864, the congregation purchased a former Presbyterian concert hall on 6th street for use as their synagogue. 

In 1904, the congregation moved to 1421 Fifteenth Street, which also caught fire in 1912, and reopened after a year of renovations. This location was home to B'nai Israel until 1954, when the congregation moved to its current location at 3600 Riverside Boulevard. Through the next few decades, the campus expanded to include the Harry M. Tonkin Memorial Chapel, the Sosnick Library, and the Buddy Kandel education wing.

Congregation B'nai Israel owned the first Jewish cemetery in California, the Chevra Kaddisha Cemetery, Sacramento (active from 1850 until c. 1924). They were also active with the formation of the Home of Peace Cemetery in 1924, a successor to Chevra Kaddisha.

Roots of other synagogues
Between 1858 and 1861, a splinter group, calling itself B'nai Ha'Shalom had formed due to differences of opinion. The groups reunited in 1861 following floods that damaged the Bet Shalom cemetery. In 1879, the congregation turned from Orthodoxy to Reform, affiliating with the Union of American Hebrew Congregations in 1885. The more Orthodox members left to form Sacramento's Mosaic Law Synagogue. In 1970, members left the congregation to form Temple Beth Shalom in protest to the firing of the congregation's cantor.

1999 arson attack
On June 18, 1999, B'nai Israel was one of three Sacramento synagogues (also including Temple Beth Shalom and Knesset Israel Torah Center) that were set ablaze by white supremacist brothers Matthew and Tyler Williams. The attacks caused more than one million dollars in damage, with B'nai Israel alone sustaining over $800,000 in damage to its sanctuary and its library, which was destroyed. 

Undeterred, the congregation met at the Sacramento community center that same evening for Shabbat services, and days later held a rally that drew over 5,000 people from the larger community. The arsonists subsequently murdered a gay couple, Gary Matson and Winfield Mowder, in Redding, California. 

The attack was the second time that the congregation had been the target of a hate crime: the synagogue was firebombed by a 17-year-old white supremacist in 1993.

Clergy
 Rabbi Mona Alfi, Senior Rabbi
 Cantor Julie Steinberg

Former clergy
 Rabbi Joseph Leonard Levy, Senior Rabbi (1889–1893)
 Rabbi Abram Simon (1894–1899)
 Rabbi Lester Frazin, Senior Rabbi  (1974–1995)
 Rabbi Brad Bloom, Senior Rabbi (1995–2006) 
 Chazzan Carl Naluai (1979–2009)
 Rabbi Shoshanah King-Tornberg

See also
 Oldest synagogues in the United States

References

Historic Jewish communities in the United States
Jewish-American history in California
California Gold Rush
Bnai Israel
Religious buildings and structures in Sacramento, California
Culture of Sacramento, California
Religious organizations established in 1852
1852 establishments in California
20th-century attacks on synagogues and Jewish communal organizations in the United States
Arson in California